La route du bagne is a 1945 French film starring Viviane Romance.

It recorded admissions of 2,878,060 in France.

It was shot at the Victorine Studios in Nice.

References

External links
La route du bagne at IMDb

1945 films
1940s French-language films
Films set in the 1860s
Films set in Paris
1940s historical drama films
French historical drama films
French black-and-white films
1945 drama films
1940s French films